The 2019 Summit League baseball tournament took place from May 22 through 25.  The top four regular season finishers of the league's six teams met in the double-elimination tournament held at J. L. Johnson Stadium on the campus of Oral Roberts in Tulsa, Oklahoma.  The winner of the tournament, Omaha, earned the Summit League's automatic bid to the 2019 NCAA Division I baseball tournament.

Seeding
The top four finishers from the regular season were seeded one through four based on conference winning percentage during the double round robin regular season.  The teams then played a double elimination tournament.

Results

Conference championship

References

Tournament
Summit League Baseball Tournament
Summit League baseball tournament
Summit League baseball tournament